Simeria is a town in Hunedoara County, Transylvania, Romania, and an important railway junction with hump yard. Six villages are administered by the town: Bârcea Mare (Nagybarcsa), Cărpiniș (Gyertyános), Simeria Veche (Ópiski), Sântandrei (Szentandrás), Șăulești (Sárfalva) and Uroi (Arany).

References

Towns in Romania
Populated places in Hunedoara County
Localities in Transylvania